Lawrence Schick is a game designer and writer associated with role-playing games.

Early life and education
Schick attended Kent State University in Ohio.

Career
Schick, as the head of design and development at TSR, brought aboard Tom Moldvay and David Cook and many other new employees as TSR continued to grow in the early 1980s. Schick created White Plume Mountain in 1979, an adventure module for the Advanced Dungeons & Dragons fantasy role-playing game, published by TSR in 1979; the adventure was incorporated into the Greyhawk setting after the publication of the World of Greyhawk Fantasy Game Setting (1980). White Plume Mountain was ranked the 9th greatest Dungeons & Dragons adventure of all time by Dungeon magazine in 2004; one judge, commenting on the ingenuity required to complete the adventure, described it as "the puzzle dungeon to end all puzzle dungeons."

In 1981, he contributed to Chaosium's multi-system box set Thieves' World based on Robert Lynn Asprin's anthology series of the same title. The following year, he coauthored the TSR science fiction RPG Star Frontiers with David "Zeb" Cook.

Schick wrote the book Heroic Worlds: A History and Guide to Role-Playing Games, which was published in 1991.

Schick has written many other games during his career. Schick is a former executive with America Online. In May 2009, Schick joined ZeniMax Online Studios as the lead content designer for The Elder Scrolls Online. In 2010, he was promoted to lead writer, and he became lead loremaster in 2011. He left ZeniMax Online in 2019. He has also been working on writing a mobile game for WarDucks in Dublin, Ireland.

References

External links

20th-century American male writers
20th-century American writers
21st-century American writers
American gamebook writers
AOL
Dungeons & Dragons game designers
Kent State University alumni
Living people
Video game writers
Year of birth missing (living people)